The Haine is a river in southwestern Belgium and northern France.

Haine may also refer to:
Haine (surname)
Haine (film), a 1980 French film starring Klaus Kinski
La Haine, a 1995 French film
La Haine (drama), an 1874 drama by Sardou
Haine, a hamlet in Manston, Kent, England
Haine Otomiya, the protagonist of the manga The Gentlemen's Alliance Cross by Arina Tanemura
Haine, a figure in Hadza mythology

See also
Haines (disambiguation)